The German women's football league system looks like the following. On lower than its top 4 levels there are several levels of local leagues.

Source:

All leagues on same level run parallel.

See also
Football in Germany
Women's football in Germany

External links 
 FUSSBALL.DE 

 

Women's